Xylophanes crenulata is a moth of the  family Sphingidae. It is found from Brazil, Paraguay and Argentina.

References

crenulata
Moths described in 2009